Greatest Hits is a collection of most of the English songs by American Tejano-pop singer Selena. It contains all of her English songs from her Dreaming of You album, as well as both regularly and posthumously released English songs she had made throughout her career.

"Don't Throw Away My Love" is a remix of "My Love".

Track listing

Charts

Certifications

References

2003 greatest hits albums
Compilation albums published posthumously
Selena compilation albums
Albums recorded at Q-Productions